Luboš Dobrovský (born Luboš Hamerschlag, 3 February 1932 – 30 January 2020) was a Czech journalist and politician, who served as Czechoslovak Minister of Defence.

Dobrovsky's father Ludvík Hamerschlag was Jewish. Deported to Auschwitz concentration camp in September 1943, he did not survive the war. Dobrovský and his mother spent the war on a farm in Ohrada; his mother remarried the officer Josef Dobrovský after the war.

Dobrovský was member of Communist Party of Czechoslovakia and journalist of the Czechoslovak Radio between 1959 and 1968. He signed Charta 77 in the 1970s and served as a spokesman of the Civic Forum in 1989. Between October 1990 and June 1992 he was the Czechoslovak minister of defence. Later, he served as director of the Office of the Czech President Václav Havel. Between 1996 and 2000 he was the Czech Ambassador in Moscow.

References 

1932 births
2020 deaths
Writers from Kolín
Czech communists
Czechoslovak democracy activists
Czech journalists
Czech diplomats
Czech translators
Charter 77 signatories
Ambassadors of the Czech Republic to Russia
Government ministers of Czechoslovakia
Recipients of the Order of Tomáš Garrigue Masaryk
People of the Velvet Revolution
20th-century translators
Civic Movement Government ministers
Czech people of Jewish descent
Politicians from Kolín